LaDonna Adrian Gaines (December 31, 1948May 17, 2012), known professionally as Donna Summer, was an American singer and songwriter. She gained prominence during the disco era of the 1970s and became known as the "Queen of Disco", while her music gained a global following.

Influenced by the counterculture of the 1960s, Summer became the lead singer of a psychedelic rock band named Crow and moved to New York City. In 1968, she joined a German adaptation of the musical Hair in Munich, where she spent several years living, acting, and singing. There, she met music producers Giorgio Moroder and Pete Bellotte, and they went on to record influential disco hits together such as "Love to Love You Baby" and "I Feel Love", marking Summer's breakthrough into international music markets. Summer returned to the United States in 1976, and more hits such as "Last Dance", her version of "MacArthur Park", "Heaven Knows", "Hot Stuff", "Bad Girls", "Dim All the Lights", "No More Tears (Enough Is Enough)" with Barbra Streisand, and "On the Radio" followed.

Summer amassed a total of 32 chart singles on the US Billboard Hot 100 in her lifetime, including 14 top ten singles and four number one singles. She claimed a top-40 hit every year between 1976 and 1984, and from her first top-ten hit in 1976, to the end of 1982, she had 12 top-ten hits (10 were top-five hits), more than any other act during that time period. She returned to the Hot 100's top five in 1983, and claimed her final top-ten hit in 1989 with "This Time I Know It's for Real". She was the first artist to have three consecutive double albums reach the top of the US Billboard 200 chart and charted four number-one singles in the US within a 12-month period. She also charted two number-one singles on the R&B Singles chart in the US and a number-one single in the United Kingdom. Her last Hot 100 hit came in 1999 with "I Will Go with You (Con te partirò)". While her fortunes on the Hot 100 waned in subsequent decades, Summer remained a force on the Billboard Dance Club Songs chart throughout her entire career.

Summer died on May 17, 2012, from lung cancer, at her home in Naples, Florida. She sold over 100 million records worldwide, making her one of the best-selling music artists of all time. She won five Grammy Awards. In her obituary in The Times, she was described as the "undisputed queen of the Seventies disco boom" who reached the status of "one of the world's leading female singers." Moroder described Summer's work on the song "I Feel Love" as "really the start of electronic dance" music. In 2013, Summer was inducted into the Rock and Roll Hall of Fame. In December 2016, Billboard ranked her sixth on its list of the "Greatest of All Time Top Dance Club Artists".

Early life
LaDonna Adrian Gaines was born on December 31, 1948, in Boston, Massachusetts, to Andrew and Mary Gaines, and was third of seven children. She was raised in the Boston neighborhood of Mission Hill. Her father was a butcher, and her mother was a schoolteacher.

Summer's performance debut occurred at church when she was ten years old, replacing a vocalist who failed to appear. She attended Boston's Jeremiah E. Burke High School where she performed in school musicals and was considered popular. In 1967, just weeks before graduation, Summer left for New York City, where she joined the blues rock band Crow. After a record label passed on signing the group since it was only interested in the band's lead singer, the group agreed to dissolve.

Summer stayed in New York and auditioned for a role in the counterculture musical, Hair. She landed the part of Sheila and agreed to take the role in the Munich production of the show, moving there in August 1968 after getting her parents' reluctant approval. She eventually became fluent in German, singing various songs in that language, and participated in the musicals  (the German version of The Me Nobody Knows), Godspell, and Show Boat. Within three years, she moved to Vienna, Austria, and joined the Vienna Volksoper. She briefly toured with an ensemble vocal group called FamilyTree, the creation of producer Günter "Yogi" Lauke.

In 1968, Summer released (as Donna Gaines) on Polydor her first single, a German version of the title "Aquarius" from the musical Hair, followed in 1971 by a second single, a remake of the Jaynetts' 1963 hit, "Sally Go 'Round the Roses", from a one-off European deal with Decca Records. In 1969, she issued the single "If You Walkin' Alone" on Philips Records.

She married Austrian actor Helmuth Sommer in 1973, and gave birth to their daughter Natalia Pia Melanie "Mimi" Sommer, the same year. She provided backing vocals for producer-keyboardist Veit Marvos on his Ariola Records release Nice to See You, credited as "Gayn Pierre". Several subsequent singles included Donna performing with the group, and the name "Gayn Pierre" was used while performing in Godspell with Helmuth Sommer during 1972. Their marriage subsequently ended in divorce, and she married singer-guitarist Bruce Sudano in 1980.

Music career

1974–1979: Initial success

While working as a model part-time and backing singer in Munich, Summer met producer Giorgio Moroder and Pete Bellotte during a recording session for Three Dog Night at Musicland Studios. The trio forged a working partnership, and Donna was signed to their Oasis label in 1974. A demo tape of Summer's work with Moroder and Bellotte led to a deal with the European-distributed label Groovy Records. Due to an error on the record cover, Donna Sommer became Donna Summer; the name stuck. Summer's first album was Lady of the Night. It became a hit in the Netherlands, Sweden, Germany and Belgium on the strength of two songs, "The Hostage" and the title track "Lady of the Night". "The Hostage" reached the top of the charts in France, but was removed from radio playlists in Germany because of the song's subject matter; a high ranking politician that had recently been kidnapped and held for ransom. One of her first TV appearances was in the television show, Van Oekel's Discohoek, which started the breakthrough of "The Hostage", and in which she gracefully went along with the scripted absurdity and chaos in the show.

In 1975, Summer passed on an idea for a song to Moroder who was working with another artist; a song that would be called "Love To Love You Baby". Summer, Moroder and Bellotte wrote the song together, and together they worked on a demo version with Summer singing the song. Moroder decided that Summer's version should be released. Seeking an American release for the song, it was sent to Casablanca Records president Neil Bogart. Bogart played the song at one of his extravagant industry parties, where it was so popular with the crowd, they insisted that it be played over and over, each time it ended. Bogart requested that Moroder produce a longer version for discothèques. Moroder, Bellotte, and Summer returned with a 17-minute version. Bogart tweaked the title to "Love to Love You Baby (song)|Love to Love You Baby", and Casablanca signed Summer, releasing the single in November 1975. The shorter 7" version of the single was promoted by radio stations, while clubs regularly played the 17-minute version (the longer version would also appear on the album).

By early 1976, "Love to Love You Baby" had reached No. 2 on the US Hot 100 chart and had become a Gold single, while the album had sold over a million copies. The song generated controversy due to Summer's moans and groans, and some American stations, like those in Europe with the initial release, refused to play it. Despite this, "Love to Love You Baby" found chart success in several European countries, and made the Top 5 in the United Kingdom despite the BBC ban. Casablanca Records wasted no time releasing the follow-up album A Love Trilogy, featuring "Try Me, I Know We Can Make It".

In 1977, Summer released the concept album I Remember Yesterday. The song "I Feel Love", reached No. 6 on the Hot 100 chart. and No. 1 in the UK. She received her first American Music Award nomination for Favorite Soul/R&B Female Artist. The single would attain Gold status and the album went Platinum in the US. Another concept album, also released in 1977, was Once Upon a Time, a double album which told of a modern-day Cinderella "rags to riches" story. This album would attain Gold status. Summer recorded the song "Down Deep Inside" as the theme song for the 1977 film The Deep. In 1978, Summer acted in the film Thank God It's Friday, the film met with modest success; the song "Last Dance", reached No. 3 on the Hot 100. The soundtrack and single both went Gold and resulted in Summer winning her first Grammy Award, for Best Female R&B Vocal Performance. Its writer, Paul Jabara, won both an Academy Award and Golden Globe Award for the composition. Summer also had "With Your Love" and "Je t'aime... moi non plus", on the soundtrack. Her version of the Jimmy Webb ballad, "MacArthur Park", became her first No. 1 hit on the Hot 100 chart. It was also the only No. 1 hit for songwriter Jimmy Webb; the single went Gold and topped the charts for three weeks. She received a Grammy nomination for Best Female Pop Vocal Performance. The song was featured on Summer's first live album, Live and More, which also became her first album to hit number one on the US Billboard 200 chart and went double-Platinum, selling over 2 million copies. The week of November 11, 1978, Summer became the first female artist of the modern rock era to have the No. 1 single on the Hot 100 and album on the Billboard 200 charts, simultaneously. The song "Heaven Knows", which featured Brooklyn Dreams singer Joe "Bean" Esposito; reached No. 4 on the Hot 100 and became another Gold single.

In 1979, Summer won three American Music Awards for Single, Album and Female Artist, in the Disco category at the awards held in January. Summer performed at the world-televised Music for UNICEF Concert, joining contemporaries such as ABBA, Olivia Newton-John, the Bee Gees, Andy Gibb, Rod Stewart, John Denver, Earth, Wind & Fire, Rita Coolidge and Kris Kristofferson for a TV special that raised funds and awareness for the world's children. Artists donated royalties of certain songs, some in perpetuity, to benefit the cause. Summer began work on her next project with Moroder and Bellotte, Bad Girls. Moroder brought in Harold Faltermeyer, with whom he had collaborated on the soundtrack of film Midnight Express, to be the album's arranger.

In 1979, Summer gained 5 big hits such as "Hot Stuff" and "Bad Girls", "Heaven Knows", "Dim All the Lights", and No More Tears (Enough Is Enough)". The week of June 16, 1979, Summer would again have the number-one single on the Hot 100 chart, and the number-one album on the Billboard 200 chart; when "Hot Stuff" regained the top spot on the Hot 100 chart. The following week, "Bad Girls" would be on top of the US Top R&B albums chart.

1980–1985: She Works Hard For The Money, unreleased album, new record label

Summer received four nominations for the 7th Annual American Music Awards in 1980, and took home awards for Female Pop/Rock and Female Soul/R&B Artist; and well as Pop/Rock single for "Bad Girls". In 1980, her single "On the Radio", reached No. 5, selling over a million copies in the US alone, making it a Gold single. "The Wanderer" reached #3 on the Hot 100. Summer would again receive a Grammy nomination for Best Female Pop Vocal Performance. Just over a week after the awards, Summer had her own nationally televised special, The Donna Summer Special, which aired on ABC network on January 27, 1980. After the release of the On the Radio album, Summer wanted to branch out into other musical styles, which led to tensions between her and Casablanca Records. Casablanca wanted her to continue to record disco only. Summer was upset with President Neil Bogart over the early release of the single "No More Tears (Enough Is Enough)", because Casablanca didn't wait until her previous single, "Dim All the Lights", had peaked; she had penned "Dim All the Lights" alone, and was hoping for a number-one hit as a songwriter. Summer and the label parted ways in 1980, and she signed with Geffen Records, the new label started by David Geffen. Summer filed a $10 million lawsuit against Casablanca; the label counter-sued. In the end, she did not receive any money, but won the rights to her own lucrative song publishing.

Summer's first Geffen album, The Wanderer, featured an eclectic mixture of sounds, bringing elements of rock, rockabilly, new wave, and gospel music. The Wanderer was rushed to market; the producers of the album wanted more production time. The album continued Summer's streak of Gold albums with the "title track" peaking at  3 on the Hot 100 chart. Its follow-up singles were, "Cold Love",  33; and "Who Do You Think You're Foolin'",  40. Summer was nominated for Best Female Rock Vocal Performance for "Cold Love", and Best Inspirational Performance for "I Believe in Jesus" at the 1981 Grammy Awards.

She would soon be working on her next album. It was to be another double album set. When David Geffen stopped by the studio for a preview, he was warned that it was a work in progress, but it was almost done. That was a mistake, because only a few tracks had been finished, and most of them were in demo phase. He heard enough to tell producers that it was not good enough; the project was canceled. It would be released years later in 1996, under the title I'm a Rainbow. Over the years, a few of the tracks would be released. The song "Highway Runner" appears on the soundtrack for the film Fast Times at Ridgemont High. "Romeo" appears on the Flashdance soundtrack. Both, "I'm a Rainbow" and "Don't Cry for Me Argentina" would be on her 1993 anthology album.

David Geffen hired top R&B and pop producer Quincy Jones to produce Summer's next album, the eponymously titled Donna Summer. The album took over six months to record as Summer, who was pregnant at the time, found it hard to sing. During the recording of the project, Neil Bogart died of cancer in May 1982 at age 39. Summer would sing at his funeral. The album included the top-ten hit "Love Is in Control (Finger on the Trigger)"; for which she received a Grammy nomination for Best Female R&B Vocal Performance. Summer was also nominated for Best Female Rock Vocal Performance for "Protection", penned for her by Bruce Springsteen. Other singles included a cover of the Jon and Vangelis song "State of Independence" ( 41 pop) and "The Woman in Me" (No. 33 pop).

By then Geffen Records had been notified by Polygram Records, which now owned Casablanca, that Summer still needed to deliver to them one more album to fulfill her contract. Summer had her biggest success in the 1980s while on Geffen's roster with her next album She Works Hard for the Money and its title song—which were released by Mercury Records in a one-off arrangement to settle Summer's split with the soon-to-be-defunct Casablanca Records, whose catalogue now resided with Mercury and Casablanca's parent company PolyGram.

Summer recorded and delivered the album She Works Hard for the Money and Polygram released it on its Mercury imprint in 1983. The title song became a major hit, reaching  3 on the US Hot 100, as well as No. 1 on Billboards R&B chart for three weeks. It also garnered Summer another Grammy nomination, for Best Female Pop Vocal Performance. "Unconditional Love", which featured the British group Musical Youth, and "Love Has a Mind of Its Own" did not crack the top 40. The album itself was certified Gold, and climbed to  9 on the Billboard 200 chart; the highest chart position of any female artist in male-dominated 1983. The song "He's a Rebel" would win Summer her third Grammy Award, this time for Best Inspirational Performance.

British director Brian Grant was hired to direct Summer's video for "She Works Hard for the Money". The video was a success, being nominated for Best Female Video and Best Choreography at the 1984 MTV Music Video Awards; Summer became one of the first African-American artists, and the first African-American female artist to have her video played in heavy rotation on MTV. Grant would also be hired to direct Summer's Costa Mesa HBO concert special, A Hot Summers Night. Grant, who was a fan of the song "State of Independence", had an idea for a grand finale. He wanted a large chorus of children to join Summer on stage at the ending of the song. His team looked for local school children in Orange County, to create a chorus of 500 students. On the final day of rehearsals, the kids turned up and they had a full rehearsal. According to Grant, "It looked and sounded amazing. It was a very emotional, very tearful experience for everyone who was there." He thought if this was that kind of reaction in rehearsal, then what an impact it would have in the concert. After the rehearsal Grant was informed that he could not use the kids because the concert would end after 10 pm; children could not be licensed to be on stage at such a late hour (California had strict child labor laws in 1983). "It's a moment that I regret immensely: a grand finale concept I came up with that couldn't be filmed in the end". When the final sequence was filmed, Summer's daughter Mimi and her family members joined her on stage for "State of Independence".

In late 1983, David Geffen enlisted "She Works Hard for the Money's" producer Michael Omartian to produce Cats Without Claws. Summer was happy that Geffen and his executives stayed out of the studio during the recording and thanked him in the album's liner notes, but her request for the lead single would be rejected. The album failed to attain Gold status in the US, her first album not to do so. It was first album not to yield a top-ten hit, since 1977's Once Upon a Time. The Drifters cover "There Goes My Baby" reached No. 21 and "Supernatural Love" went to No. 75. She would win another Grammy for Best Inspirational Performance for the song "Forgive Me".

On January 19, 1985, she sang at the nationally televised 50th Presidential Inaugural Gala the day before the second inauguration of Ronald Reagan.

1986–1989: All Systems Go, Another Place and Time
In 1986, Harold Faltermeyer wrote the title song for a German ski movie called Fire and Ice, and thought Summer would be ideal to sing the song. He decided to reach out to Summer and, although she was not interested in singing the song, she was very much interested in working with Faltermeyer again. After a meeting with David Geffen he was on board with the project. Summer's main objective for the album was that it have stronger R&B influences; Faltermeyer who had just finished doing the soundtracks to Top Gun and Fletch, was after a tough FM-oriented sound. On completion, Geffen liked what he heard, but his executives did not think there were enough songs that could be deemed singles. They wanted Faltermeyer to produce "Dinner with Gershwin", but he was already busy with another project, so another producer was found. They also substituted a previous recording called "Bad Reputation", songs like "Fascination", fell by the wayside. Geffen had shared the vision of moving Summer into the R&B market as a veteran artist, but these expectations were not met. Faltermeyer, in a 2012 interview with Daeida Magazine, said, "She was an older artist by then and the label's priority may have been on the youth market. The decision was made afterward by executives who were looking for a radio hit for 1987 and not something that would perhaps last beyond then." The label's President Ed Rosenblatt would later admit: "The company never intended to focus on established superstars". The album All Systems Go, did not achieve Gold status and became her lowest charting studio album in the US to date. The single "Dinner with Gershwin" (written by Brenda Russell) stalled at 48 in the US, though it became a hit in the UK, peaking at  13. The album's title track, "All Systems Go", was released only in the UK, where it peaked at  54.

For Summer's next album, Geffen Records hired the British hit production team of Stock Aitken Waterman (or SAW), who enjoyed incredible success writing and producing for such acts as Kylie Minogue, Bananarama, and Rick Astley, among others. The SAW team describe the working experience as a labour of love, and said it was their favourite album of all that they had recorded. Geffen decided not to release the album Another Place and Time, and Summer and Geffen Records parted ways in 1988. The album was released in Europe in March 1989 on Warner Bros. Records, which had been Summer's label in Europe since 1982. The single "This Time I Know It's for Real" became a top ten hit in several countries in Europe, prompting Warner Bros.' sister company, Atlantic Records, to sign Summer in the US. The single peaked at  7 on the US Hot 100 and became her 12th Gold single in America. She scored two more UK hits from the album, "I Don't Wanna Get Hurt" (UK  7) and "Love's About to Change My Heart" (UK  20).

In 1989, Summer and her husband, Bruce Sudano, had been in talks to do a new kind of reality-based sitcom. It would be based on their own hectic household. At the time, they lived with their children Amanda, Brooklyn and Mimi, two sets of in-laws, and a maid. The television network started changing the premise of the show, making it less funny, says Sudano, "And because we were an interracial couple, they didn't want us to be married anymore". In 1989, this was "an issue. So with that mentality we just backed out of it."

1990–1999: Mistaken Identity, acting, and Live & More Encore
In 1990, a Warner compilation, The Best of Donna Summer, was released (no US issue). The album went Gold in the UK after the song "State of Independence" was re-released there to promote the album. The following year, Summer worked with producer Keith Diamond emerged with the album Mistaken Identity, which included elements of R&B as well as new jack swing. "When Love Cries" continued her success on the R&B charts, reaching  18. However, the album was commercially unsuccessful, failing to enter the US Billboard 200 and any chart outside the United States. It only entered at number 97 on the US Top R&B Albums chart. In 1992, Summer embarked on a world tour and later that year received a star on the Hollywood Walk of Fame. She reunited with Giorgio Moroder, for the song "Carry On", which was included on the 1993, Polygram issued The Donna Summer Anthology, it contained 34 tracks of Summer's material with Casablanca and Mercury Records, and from her tenures with Atlantic and Geffen.

Summer signed with Mercury/Polygram that same year, and in 1994 she re-teamed with producer Michael Omartian to record a Christmas album, Christmas Spirit, which included classic Christmas songs such as "O Holy Night" and "White Christmas" and three Summer-penned songs, "Christmas is Here", "Lamb of God" and the album's title track. Summer was accompanied by the Nashville Symphony Orchestra. Another hits collection, Endless Summer: Greatest Hits, was released featuring eighteen songs. There were two new tracks "Melody of Love (Wanna Be Loved)" and "Any Way at All". In 1994, she also contributed to the Tribute to Edith Piaf album, singing "La Vie En Rose". In 1995, "Melody of Love (Wanna Be Loved)" went No. 1 on the US dance charts, and No. 21 in the UK. In 1996, Summer recorded a duet with Bruce Roberts, "Whenever There Is Love", which appeared on the soundtrack to the film Daylight. In 1996, Summer also recorded "Does He Love You" with Liza Minnelli, which appeared Minnelli's Gently.

During this time, Summer had role on the sitcom Family Matters as Steve Urkel's (Jaleel White) Aunt Oona. She made a few appearances in 1997. In 1998, Summer received the first Grammy Award for Best Dance Recording, after a remixed version of her 1992 collaboration with Giorgio Moroder, "Carry On", was released in 1997. In 1999, Summer was asked to do the Divas 2 concert, but when she went in and met with the producers, it was decided that they would do Donna in concert by herself. Summer taped a live television special for VH1 titled Donna Summer – Live & More Encore, producing the second-highest ratings for the network that year, after their annual Divas special. A CD of the event was released by Epic Records and featured two studio recordings, "I Will Go with You (Con te partirò)" and "Love Is the Healer", both of which reached No. 1 on the US dance charts.

2000–2009: Later recordings and Crayons

In 2000, Summer participated in VH1's third annual Divas special, dedicated to Diana Ross; she sang the Supremes hit Reflections, and her own material for the show. "The Power of One" is a theme song for the movie Pokémon: The Movie 2000. The dramatic ballad was produced by David Foster and dance remixes were also issued to DJs and became another dance floor success for Summer, peaking at No. 2 on the same chart in 2000. In 2003, Summer issued her autobiography, Ordinary Girl: The Journey, and released a best-of set titled The Journey: The Very Best of Donna Summer. In 2004, Summer was inducted into the Dance Music Hall of Fame as an artist, alongside the Bee Gees and Barry Gibb. Her classic song, "I Feel Love", was inducted that night as well. In 2004 and 2005, Summer's success on the dance charts continued with the songs "You're So Beautiful" and "I Got Your Love". In 2004, Summer re-recorded the track with the Irish pop band Westlife (with a live performance) for the compilation album, DiscoMania.

In 2008, Summer released her first studio album of fully original material in 17 years, entitled Crayons. Released on the Sony BMG label Burgundy Records, it peaked at No. 17 on the US Top 200 Album Chart, her highest placing on the chart since 1983. The songs "I'm a Fire", "Stamp Your Feet" and "Fame (The Game)" all reached No. 1 on the US Billboard Dance Chart. The ballad "Sand on My Feet" was released to adult contemporary stations and reached No. 30 on that chart. Summer said, "I wanted this album to have a lot of different directions on it. I did not want it to be any one baby. I just wanted it to be a sampler of flavors and influences from all over the world. There's a touch of this, a little smidgeon of that, a dash of something else, like when you're cooking." On December 11, 2009, Donna Summer appeared at the Nobel Peace Prize Concert for Barack Obama.

2010–present: Final recordings and posthumous releases
On July 29, 2010, Summer gave an interview with Allvoices.com wherein she was asked if she would consider doing an album of standards. She said, "I actually am, probably in September. I will begin work on a standards album. I will probably do an all-out dance album and a standards album. I'm going to do both and we will release them however we're going to release them. We are not sure which is going first."

In August 2010, Summer released the single "To Paris With Love", co-written with Bruce Roberts and produced by Peter Stengaard. The single went to No. 1 on the US Billboard Dance Chart in October 2010. That month, Summer also appeared on the PBS television special Hitman Returns: David Foster and Friends. In it, Summer performed with Seal on a medley of the songs "Un-Break My Heart", "Crazy", and "On the Radio" before closing the show with "Last Dance".

On September 15, 2010, Summer appeared as a guest celebrity, singing alongside contestant Prince Poppycock, on the television show America's Got Talent.

Also in 2010, Summer recorded a version of the Dan Fogelberg song "Nether Lands" for a Fogelberg tribute project. According to a comment on Fogelberg's website, the song had great personal significance for Summer.

On June 6, 2011, Summer was a guest judge on the show Platinum Hit, in an episode entitled "Dance Floor Royalty". In July of that same year, Summer was working at Paramount Recording Studios in Los Angeles with her nephew, the rapper and producer O'Mega Red. Together they worked on a track titled "Angel".

On December 11, 2012, after four prior nominations, Summer was posthumously announced to be one of the 2013 inductees to the Rock and Roll Hall of Fame, and was inducted on April 18, 2013, at Los Angeles' Nokia Theater.

A remix album titled Love to Love You Donna, containing new remixes of some of Summer's classics, was released in October 2013. "MacArthur Park" was remixed by Laidback Luke for the remix collection; it was also remixed by Ralphi Rosario, which version was released to dance clubs all over America and successfully peaked at No. 1, giving Summer her first posthumous number-one single, and her sixteenth number-one on the charts.

In 2021, Summer's estate released a reedited version of her ninth studio album I'm a Rainbow, subtitled Recovered & Recoloured. The new edition is reduced to 10 tracks (15 on vinyl and streaming releases), with each song remixed by contemporary producers and remixers.

Her self-titled album was re-released in 2022 by Summer's estate subtitled as 40th Anniversary Edition.

Controversy
In the mid-1980s, Summer was embroiled in a controversy when she allegedly made anti-gay remarks regarding the relatively new disease, AIDS. Summer publicly denied she had ever made such comments and in a letter to the AIDS campaign group ACT UP in 1989 said it was "A terrible misunderstanding". In explaining why she did not respond to ACT UP sooner Summer stated, "I was unknowingly protected by those around me from the bad press and hate letters. If I have caused you pain, forgive me". She closed her letter with Bible quotes (from Chapter 13 of 1 Corinthians).

In 1989, Summer told The Advocate magazine, "A couple of the people I write with are gay, and they have been ever since I met them. What people want to do with their bodies is their personal preference". A couple of years later, she filed a lawsuit against New York magazine when it printed an old story about the rumors as fact, just as she was about to release her album Mistaken Identity in 1991. According to a Biography television program dedicated to Summer in which she participated in 1995, the lawsuit was settled out of court, though neither side was able to divulge any details.

Personal life

Summer was raised in the African Methodist Episcopal Church. She married the Austrian actor Helmuth Sommer in 1973, and gave birth to their daughter Natalia Pia Melanie Sommer (called Mimi) the same year. The couple divorced in 1976, but Summer adopted a version of her ex-husband's surname as her stage name.

Summer married Brooklyn Dreams singer Bruce Sudano on July 16, 1980. On January 5, 1981, she gave birth to their daughter Brooklyn Sudano (who is now an actress, singer and dancer), and on August 11, 1982, she gave birth to their daughter Amanda Sudano (who in 2005 became one half of the musical duo Johnnyswim, alongside Abner Ramirez). Summer was also one of the founding members of Oasis Church in Los Angeles.

Summer and her family moved from the Sherman Oaks area of Los Angeles to Nashville, Tennessee, in 1995, where she took time off from show business to focus on painting, a hobby she had developed in the 1980s.

Death
Summer died on May 17, 2012, aged 63, at her home in Naples, Florida, from lung cancer. Long a nonsmoker, Summer theorized that her cancer had been caused by inhaling toxic fumes and dust from the September 11 attacks in New York City; she was in her apartment near Ground Zero when the attacks occurred. However, some reports have instead attributed the cancer to Summer's smoking during her younger years, her continued exposure to second-hand smoking while performing in clubs well after she had quit, and a predisposition to this disease in the family. Summer was survived by her husband, Bruce Sudano, and her three daughters.

Summer's funeral service was held in Christ Presbyterian Church in Nashville, Tennessee, on the afternoon of May 23, 2012. The exact location and time of the service were kept private. Several hundred of Summer's friends and relatives attended the funeral, according to CNN. The funeral was a private ceremony, and cameras were not allowed inside the church. She was interred in the Harpeth Hills Memory Gardens cemetery in Nashville.

Reaction

Singers and music industry professionals around the world reacted to Summer's death. Gloria Gaynor said she was "deeply saddened" and that Summer was "a fine lady and human being". Liza Minnelli said, "She was a queen, The Queen Of Disco, and we will be dancing to her music forever." She said that her "thoughts and prayers are with her family always." Dolly Parton said, "Donna, like Whitney, was one of the greatest voices ever. I loved her records. She was the disco queen and will remain so. I knew her and found her to be one of the most likable and fun people ever. She will be missed and remembered." Janet Jackson wrote that Summer "changed the world of music with her beautiful voice and incredible talent." Barbra Streisand wrote, "I loved doing the duet with her. She had an amazing voice and was so talented. It's so sad." Quincy Jones wrote that Summer's voice was "the heartbeat and soundtrack of a generation."

Aretha Franklin said, "It's so shocking to hear about the passing of Donna Summer. In the 1970s, she reigned over the disco era and kept the disco jumping. Who will forget 'Last Dance'? A fine performer and a very nice person." Chaka Khan said, "Donna and I had a friendship for over 30 years. She is one of the few black women I could speak German with and she is one of the few friends I had in this business." Gloria Estefan averred that "It's the end of an era", and posted a photo of herself with Summer. Mary J. Blige tweeted "RIP Donna Summer !!!!!!!! You were truly a game changer !!!" Lenny Kravitz wrote "Rest in peace Donna, You are a pioneer and you have paved the way for so many of us. You transcended race and genre. Respect. Lenny".

Beyoncé wrote a personal note: "Donna Summer made music that moved me both emotionally and physically to get up and dance. You could always hear the deep passion in her voice. She was so much more than the queen of disco she became known for, she was an honest and gifted singer with flawless vocal talent. I've always been a huge fan and was honored to sample one of her songs. She touched many generations and will be sadly missed. My love goes out to her family during this difficult time. Love, B".

David Foster said, "My wife and I are in shock and truly devastated. Donna changed the face of pop culture forever. There is no doubt that music would sound different today if she had never graced us with her talent. She was a super-diva and a true superstar who never compromised when it came to her career or her family. She always did it with class, dignity, grace and zero attitude. She lived in rare air ... She was the most spectacular, considerate, constant, giving, generous and loving friend of 35 years. I am at a total loss trying to process this tragic news."

US President Barack Obama said, "Michelle and I were saddened to hear about the passing of Donna Summer. A five-time Grammy Award winner, Donna truly was the 'Queen of Disco.' Her voice was unforgettable and the music industry has lost a legend far too soon. Our thoughts and prayers go out to Donna's family and her dedicated fans."

Summer was honored at the 2012 Billboard Music Awards ceremony. Singer Natasha Bedingfield honored Summer, calling her "a remarkable woman who brought so much light and who inspired many women, including myself, through her music. And if we can remember her through her music, this will never really be the last dance." After her statement, she began to sing "Last Dance", Summer's Academy Award-winning song. As she sang the song, photos of Summer were displayed on a screen overhead.

Fans paid tribute to Summer by leaving flowers and memorabilia on her star on the Hollywood Walk of Fame. A few days after her death, her album sales increased by 3,277%, according to Nielsen SoundScan. Billboard magazine reported that the week before she died, Summer sold about 1,000 albums. After her death that number increased to 26,000.

Legacy

According to singer Marc Almond, Summer's collaboration with producer Giorgio Moroder "changed the face of music". Summer was the first artist to have three consecutive double albums reach No. 1 on Billboards album chart: Live and More, Bad Girls and On the Radio: Greatest Hits Volumes I & II. She became a cultural icon and her prominence on the dance charts, for which she was referred to as the Queen of Disco, made her not just one of the defining voices of that era, but also an influence on pop artists from Madonna to Beyoncé. Unlike some other stars of disco who faded as the music became less popular in the early 1980s, Summer was able to grow beyond the genre and segued to a pop-rock sound. She had one of her biggest hits in the 1980s with "She Works Hard For the Money", which became another anthem, this time for women's rights. Summer was the first black woman to be nominated for an MTV Video Music Award. Summer remained a force on the Billboard Dance/Club Play Songs chart throughout her career and notched 16 number one singles. Her last studio album, 2008's Crayons, spun off three No. 1 dance/club hits with "I'm a Fire", "Stamp Your Feet" and "Fame (The Game)". In May 2012, it was announced that "I Feel Love" was included in the list of preserved recordings at the Library of Congress' National Recording Registry. Her Rock and Roll Hall of Fame page listed Summer as "the Diva De Tutte Dive, the first true diva of the modern pop era".

In 2018, Summer: The Donna Summer Musical, a biographical musical featuring Summer's songs, began performances on Broadway at the Lunt-Fontanne Theatre, following a 2017 world premiere at the La Jolla Playhouse in San Diego.

In the 2019 film How to Build a Girl, Donna Summer is among the figures featured in Johanna's wall collage.

Concert tours

Once Upon a Time Tour (1977–1978)
Bad Girls Tour (1979)
The Wanderer Tour (1981)
Hard for the Money Tour (1983)
The Rainbow Tour (1984)
Silver Girl Tour (1986)
All Systems Go Tour (1987)
Mistaken Identity Tour (1991–1992)
Endless Summer Tour (1995)
Mid Summer Nights Dream Tour (1996–1998)
Live & More Encore Tour (1999)
Greatest Hits Tour (2005–2007)
Crayons Tour (2008)

Discography

Studio albums

 Lady of the Night (1974)
 Love to Love You Baby (1975)
 A Love Trilogy (1976)
 Four Seasons of Love (1976)
 I Remember Yesterday (1977)
 Once Upon a Time (1977)
 Bad Girls (1979)
 The Wanderer (1980)
 Donna Summer (1982)
 She Works Hard for the Money (1983)
 Cats Without Claws (1984)
 All Systems Go (1987)
 Another Place and Time (1989)
 Mistaken Identity (1991)
 Christmas Spirit (1994)
 I'm a Rainbow (1996) 
 Crayons (2008)

Filmography

Awards and nominations

References

External links

  – official site
 
 

 
 
 
 
 

 
1948 births
2012 deaths
Grammy Award winners
Grammy Award winners for dance and electronic music
African-American women singers
African-American rock singers
African-American actresses
American dance musicians
American disco musicians
American women pop singers
American women rock singers
American women singer-songwriters
American film actresses
American rhythm and blues singers
American rock songwriters
American soul singers
American television actresses
Crossover (music)
German-language singers
American women in electronic music
Atlantic Records artists
Casablanca Records artists
Geffen Records artists
Mercury Records artists
American expatriates in Austria
American expatriates in Germany
Burials in Tennessee
Deaths from lung cancer in Florida
People from Naples, Florida
Actresses from Boston
Musicians from Boston
Musicians from Nashville, Tennessee
Singer-songwriters from California
Singer-songwriters from Florida
Singer-songwriters from Tennessee
African-American Methodists
20th-century Methodists
21st-century Methodists
20th-century American actresses
21st-century American actresses
20th-century American singers
21st-century American singers
20th-century American women singers
21st-century American women singers
American disco singers
People from Mission Hill, Boston
American Methodists
African-American songwriters
Singer-songwriters from Massachusetts